L100 may refer to:
L 100, a Belgian resistance organisation
Albatros L 100, light aircraft built in Germany
Hammond L-100, an electric organ series
, a Bay-class landing ship with the Royal Fleet Auxiliary (RFA)
, Type II Hunt-class destroyer of the Royal Navy
JBL L-100, a model of musical loudspeaker
Landsverk L-100, Swedish prototype tank in development during World War II
Lockheed L-100 Hercules, the civilian variant of the prolific C-130 military transport aircraft
Mitsubishi L100, a kei truck model
Nikon Coolpix L100, a semi-compact, digital camera
Saturn L100, a sedan made by Saturn Corporation in Wilmington, Delaware
Strv L-100, a prototype light tank design by Landsverk in 1933-34

See also
Lunar 100 list of the Moon's most interesting regions to observe.